Yoma (יומא) is the fifth tractate of Seder Moed ("Order of Festivals") of the Mishnah and of the Talmud.

Yoma may also refer to:

People
Yoma Komatsu, the eldest member of the J-Pop group BeForU
Amira Yoma (born 1952), Argentine political advisor and restaurateur
Zulema Yoma, former first lady of Argentina

Other uses
Chin Hills-Arakan Yoma montane forests, a tropical and subtropical moist broadleaf forest ecoregion in western Myanmar
Yoma (butterfly), a genus of butterfly
Yoma danio, a fish in the Cyprinid family

See also
Yōma (disambiguation)